The Final is a 2010 American psychological horror thriller film written by Jason Kabolati, directed by Joey Stewart, and starring Jascha Washington, Julin, Justin S. Arnold, Lindsay Seidel, Marc Donato, Laura Ashley Samuels, Ryan Hayden, and Travis Tedford.

Plot
A disfigured teenage girl enters a restaurant and quickly draws the attention of everyone there. She begins crying, and a flashback begins...

In high school, Ravi gets bullied by Bradley and Bernard. Emily is taunted and abused by three girls, Heather, Bridget, and Kelli. Dane, another outcast, has an old, secluded house in the woods which he inherited from his late uncle.

Kurtis is a likable student and an aspiring actor. He invites his schoolmates to a video shoot. There, Bradley and Bernard insult Ravi in the restroom and break his camera. Dane stumbles in, and Bradley intimidates him, revealing that he has been bullying Dane as well. The next day at school, after learning of the incident, Kurtis confronts Bradley, asking him to leave his friends alone.

The outcasts, Emily, Jack, Ravi and Andy and Dane, decide to get revenge on the bullies and send a message to the community. Among their inspirations are horror films and lessons in class about deadly chemicals and torture methods of old cultures. They plan to spare Kurtis, as he doesn't mistreat them. They prepare a costume party at Dane's secluded house and invite the bullies over. They lace the punch bowl with a drug, causing everyone who drinks from it to fall unconscious. They see Kurtis among the group but still proceed with the plan.

When the teens wake up, they find themselves chained together. The outcasts then declare their intention to make them suffer a fate worse than death, as revenge for the years they have suffered from bullying. In their first act of violence, Jack shoots Miles, a loud-mouthed teenager, with a cattle gun to his face and knee. One boy, Tommy, flees for help, but steps into a bear trap in the woods. Three boys nicknamed The Triplets, who help the outcasts, capture and bring him back to the house.

Ravi immobilizes and silences a drug at Bernard and then is tortured with needles by Emily. Ravi secretly gives Kurtis a key, and he escapes. Dane, obsessed with revenge, stabs and kills Ravi. The torture continues with Emily smearing a corrosive compound on Heather's face. As Bridget apologizes to Emily, she tells her to cut off Bradley's fingers to spare herself. She is unable to do it. When Emily gives the offer to Bradley, he agrees and cuts off two of Bridget's fingers. Emily then smears the compound on half of Bridget's face.

Kurtis encounters Deputy Henessey and asks for help, but the Triplets shoot the Deputy. Kurtis grabs his gun, flees to a neighboring house and informs the owner, Parker, an elderly war veteran, of the events in Dane's house. However, Parker doesn't trust Kurtis because he has a gun. After tying up Kurtis to an armchair, Parker goes to Dane's house alone to investigate. He trips over a cord, and a trap severely injures his legs. Despite the injuries, he successfully kills two of the Triplets.

An insane Dane taunts Bradley, who attempts to apologize. Dane severs his spinal cord with a switchblade, paralyzing him from the waist down. After freeing himself, Kurtis calls the police and heads to Dane's house. As Andy is about to cut off Riggs' tongue, Kurtis appears and kills Andy. Dane shoots Kurtis in the arm, but Emily kills him before he can kill Kurtis. Emily says her last words to Kelli, then has Jack shoot her dead. As the police burst in, Jack kills himself after saying: "There are more like us out there".

The next day, a news reporter recounts how the popular kids were abducted and tortured "without reason". Kelli, unharmed but traumatized by the events, plans to die by suicide. At school, Kurtis exchanges eye contact with the remaining Triplet. The final scene reveals that Bridget is the disfigured girl from the beginning of the film.

Cast

Release
The film is part of the After Dark Horrorfest 2012 and was presented on November 23. The DVD was released on November 23 by After Dark Films.

Reviews
The Movie Spot gave the film a 3.5 out of 5 saying "The Final is a decent movie. And a great entry to the Horrorfest series." The film holds a 13% "rotten" rating on Rotten Tomatoes, based on eight reviews.

References

External links

2010 horror films
2010 films
2010s high school films
2010 horror thriller films
2010 independent films
2010s psychological horror films
2010 psychological thriller films
2010s teen horror films
American films about revenge
American high school films
American horror thriller films
American independent films
American psychological horror films
American psychological thriller films
American teen horror films
Films about bullying
Films set in Texas
Films shot in Dallas
2010s English-language films
2010s American films